Faristenia polemica is a moth in the family Gelechiidae. It is found in India (Bengal) and Thailand.

The length of the forewings is about 14 mm. The species can be separated from its close relatives by the well-developed, large, trapezoidal median costal patch.

The larvae feed on Michelia champaca.

References

Faristenia
Moths described in 1935